Helmut Lütkepohl (born 26 July 1951) is a German econometrician specializing in time series analysis. Since January 2012, he has been Bundesbank Professor in the field of "Methods of Empirical Economics" at the Free University of Berlin and Dean of the Graduate Center at the German Institute for Economic Research.

Education and career 
After a diplom (1977) and doctorate (1981) from Bielefeld University, Lütkepohl was a Visiting Assistant Professor at the University of California, San Diego (1984–85). He became Professor of Statistics at the University of Kiel in 1987, and later moved on to become Professor of Econometrics at Humboldt University of Berlin.

Lütkepohl has been on the editorial boards of several scientific journals like Econometric Theory, Journal of Econometrics, Journal of Applied Econometrics, Macroeconomic Dynamics, Empirical Economics, and Econometric Reviews, and has published numerous papers in academic journals. He is the author, co-author and editor of many books, like Handbook of Matrices (Wiley, 1996), Applied Time Series Econometrics (Cambridge University Press, 2004) and New Introduction to Multiple Time Series Analysis (Springer, 2005).

Selected publications

References

External links 
 Website at the FU Berlin

1951 births
Living people
German economists
Time series econometricians
Bielefeld University alumni
Academic staff of the Humboldt University of Berlin
Academic staff of the University of Kiel